Rajesh Subramaniam is the CEO and President of the FedEx Corporation. Prior to this position, he held many organizational management and marketing roles in Asia and the US at FedEx.

Early life and education
Subramaniam was born in Thiruvananthapuram, Kerala, India. He attended the Loyola School in the city. At age 15, he moved to Mumbai, where he attended IIT Bombay and graduated with a B.Tech. in chemical engineering in 1987.

He moved to the United States on a scholarship to Syracuse University and earned an MS in chemical engineering in 1989. He also earned an MBA from the University of Texas at Austin during the early 1990s recession.

Career
Subramaniam joined FedEx in 1991 as an associate marketing analyst. He quickly rose through the ranks and held several management and marketing roles in Asia and the US. Beginning in 1996, he served as the Vice-President of Marketing at FedEx Express in the Asia-Pacific region, and was then appointed as the regional president of Canada in 2003. From 2013 to 2019, he served as the Executive VP, marketing and communication.

In late 2018, he was promoted to the CEO of FedEx’s legacy Express business. After retirement of David J. Bronczek in 2019, Subramaniam was named the COO. He joined the FedEx board in January 2020.

In March 2022, FedEx announced that Subramaniam will replace founder Fred Smith as the President and CEO, effective June 1st.

He serves on the board of directors of FedEx Corporation, FIRST, the United States Chamber of Commerce's China Center Advisory Board, US-India Strategic Partnership Forum, and the US-China Business Council.

References

External links
 FedEx bio

1967 births
Living people
Businesspeople from Thiruvananthapuram
Indian emigrants to the United States
FedEx people
IIT Bombay alumni
Syracuse University College of Engineering and Computer Science alumni
University of Texas at Austin alumni